This is a list of defunct airlines of Saudi Arabia.

See also
 List of airlines of Saudi Arabia
 List of airports in Saudi Arabia

References

Saudi Arabia
Airlines
Airlines, defunct